Phalangeriformes is an suborder of Australian marsupial mammals. Members of this suborder are called phalangeriformes, and include possums, gliders, and cuscus. Phalangeriformes is one of three suborders that form the order Diprotodontia, the largest extant order of marsupials. They are found in Australia, New Guinea, and Indonesia, and are generally found in forests, though some species can also be found in shrublands and grasslands. They range in size from the Tasmanian pygmy possum, at  plus a  tail, to the cuscus of the Spilocuscus genus, at  plus a  tail. Phalangeriformes primarily eat leaves, fruit, and insects, though many are omnivorous and will eat small vertebrates or other plant material.

Many phalangeriformes do not have population estimates, but the ones that do range from 50 members to 75,000. No species have gone extinct in modern times, but four species are categorized as endangered species: Tate's triok, mahogany glider, Gebe cuscus, and Woodlark cuscus. A further eight species are categorized as critically endangered: Leadbeater's possum, northern glider, western ringtail possum, mountain pygmy possum, Talaud bear cuscus, Telefomin cuscus, black-spotted cuscus, and blue-eyed spotted cuscus.

The sixty-four extant species of Phalangeriformes are divided into six families grouped into two superfamilies: Petauroidea, containing two species in two genera in the family Acrobatidae, eleven in three genera in the family Petauridae, eighteen in six genera in the family Pseudocheiridae, and a single species in the family Tarsipedidae; and Phalangeroidea, containing five species in two genera in the family Burramyidae and twenty-seven in five genera in the family Phalangeridae. Several extinct Phalangeriformes species have been discovered, though due to ongoing research and discoveries the exact number and categorization is not fixed.

Conventions

Conservation status codes listed follow the International Union for Conservation of Nature (IUCN) Red List of Threatened Species. Range maps are provided wherever possible; if a range map is not available, a description of the phalangeriformes's range is provided. Ranges are based on the IUCN Red List for that species unless otherwise noted. All extinct genera, species, or subspecies listed alongside extant species went extinct after 1500 CE, and are indicated by a dagger symbol "".

Classification
The suborder Phalangeriformes consists of six extant families grouped into two superfamilies: Acrobatidae, Petauridae, Pseudocheiridae, and Tarsipedidae in the superfamily Petauroidea, and Burramyidae and Phalangeridae in the superfamily Phalangeroidea. Acrobatidae contains two species in two genera, Petauridae contains eleven species in three genera, Pseudocheiridae contains eighteen species in six genera, Tarsipedidae contains a single species, Burramyidae contains five species in two genera, and Phalangeridae contains twenty-seven species in five genera.

Superfamily Petauroidea
 Family Acrobatidae
 Genus Acrobates (feathertail glider): one species
 Genus Distoechurus (feather-tailed possum): one species
 Family Petauridae
 Genus Dactylopsila (trioks): four species
 Genus Gymnobelideus (Leadbeater's possum): one species
 Genus Petaurus (gliders): six species
 Family Pseudocheiridae
 Subfamily Hemibelideinae
 Genus Hemibelideus (lemuroid ringtail possum): one species
 Genus Petauroides (southern greater glider): one species
 Subfamily Pseudocheirinae
 Genus Petropseudes (rock-haunting ringtail possum): one species
 Genus Pseudocheirus (ringtail possums): two species
 Genus Pseudochirulus (ringtail possums): eight species
 Subfamily Pseudochiropsinae
 Genus Pseudochirops (ringtail possums): five species
 Family Tarsipedidae
 Genus Tarsipes (honey possum): one species

Superfamily Phalangeroidea
 Family Burramyidae
 Genus Burramys (mountain pygmy possum): one species
 Genus Cercartetus (pygmy possums): four species
 Family Phalangeridae
 Subfamily Ailuropinae
 Genus Ailurops (bear cuscus): two species
 Subfamily Phalangerinae
 Genus Phalanger (cuscus): thirteen species
 Genus Spilocuscus (spotted cuscus): five species
 Genus Strigocuscus (cuscus): two species
 Genus Trichosurus (brushtail possums): four species
 Genus Wyulda (scaly-tailed possum): one species

Phalangeriformes
The following classification is based on the taxonomy described by the reference work Mammal Species of the World (2005), with augmentation by generally accepted proposals made since using molecular phylogenetic analysis, as supported by both the IUCN and the American Society of Mammalogists.

Superfamily Petauroidea

Acrobatidae

Petauridae

Pseudocheiridae

Subfamily Hemibelideinae

Subfamily Pseudocheirinae

Subfamily Pseudochiropsinae

Tarsipedidae

Superfamily Phalangeroidea

Burramyidae

Phalangeridae

Subfamily Ailuropinae

Subfamily Phalangerinae

References

Sources

 
 

phalangeriformes
phalangeriformes
phalangeriformes